CSKA II is a Bulgarian football team based in Sofia. Founded in 2016, it is the reserve team of CSKA Sofia, and played one season in the Second League, the second level of Bulgarian football in 2016-2017 and being restored in 2022 to play in the Third League.

They ought to play at least one level below their main side, however, so CSKA II was ineligible for promotion to the First League and could not play in the Bulgarian Cup.

History
In June 2016 CSKA II took the place of Litex Lovech II in the Bulgarian Second League. The team was selected by CSKA and Litex youth players. After Stamen Belchev took charge of the first team CSKA II's results worsened, and the team was relegated to South-West Third League on the final day of the season following a 1–2 away defeat by Vitosha Bistritsa.  On 5 June 2017, the owners officially informed the Bulgarian Football Union that the team will not participate in the 2017–18 South-West Third League as the level was deemed too low for youth players' development. On 6 June 2017, the contract of the head coach Svetoslav Todorov was terminated.

In end of May 2022, CSKA announced that they will restore its second team and will join Third League for the 2022-23 season.\

Squad

  

 For first team players, see CSKA Sofia.

Honours

 Bulgarian V Group:
 Champions (1): 1982-83

Manager history

Past seasons

References

External links
Official website

CSKA Sofia 2
CSKA Sofia 2
2016 establishments in Bulgaria
2017 disestablishments in Bulgaria
CSKA Sofia 2
CSKA Sofia 2
CSKA